Metrernis is a genus of moths belonging to the family Tortricidae.

Species
Metrernis ochrolina Meyrick, 1906
Metrernis tencatei Diakonoff, 1957

References

 , 1906, Journal of the Bombay Natural History Society 17: 414.
 , 2005, World Catalogue of Insects volume 5 Tortricidae

External links
tortricidae.com

Chlidanotini
Taxa named by Edward Meyrick
Tortricidae genera